Springfield Township is one of the twelve townships of Williams County, Ohio, United States.  The 2000 census found 2,958 people in the township, 841 of whom lived in the unincorporated portions of the township.

Geography
Located in the southeastern corner of the county, it borders the following townships:
Brady Township - north
German Township, Fulton County - northeast
Ridgeville Township, Henry County - east
Adams Township, Defiance County - southeast corner
Tiffin Township, Defiance County - south
Washington Township, Defiance County - southwest corner
Pulaski Township - west
Jefferson Township - northwest corner

The most easterly part of the county, Springfield Township is the only county township with a border on any part of Henry County.

The village of Stryker is located in northern Springfield Township.

Name and history
Springfield Township was established in 1835. It is one of eleven Springfield Townships statewide.

Government
The township is governed by a three-member board of trustees, who are elected in November of odd-numbered years to a four-year term beginning on the following January 1. Two are elected in the year after the presidential election and one is elected in the year before it. There is also an elected township fiscal officer, who serves a four-year term beginning on April 1 of the year after the election, which is held in November of the year before the presidential election. Vacancies in the fiscal officership or on the board of trustees are filled by the remaining trustees.

References

External links
County website

Townships in Williams County, Ohio
Townships in Ohio